Sosnovka is a rural locality (a settlement) in Semizerye Rural Settlement, Kaduysky District, Vologda Oblast, Russia. The population was 196 as of 2002. There are 3 streets.

Geography 
Sosnovka is located 70 km northwest of Kaduy (the district's administrative centre) by road. Shigodskiye is the nearest rural locality.

References 

Rural localities in Kaduysky District